Emin Efendiyev, professionally known as Emin Efendi, is an Azerbaijani hip hop record producer and television presenter from Baku, Azerbaijan. Efendi is perhaps best known for producing Azerbaijani hip hop groups Dayirman and H.O.S.T., as well as his collaboration with Azerbaijani singer Miri Yusif.

Musical career 
Efendi got his start in music, working as a manager and record producer for Azerbaijani hip hop group Dayirman in 1996.

Television career 
In 2001, he started his television career by becoming television presenter on "De Gəlsin!" meykhana contest. In 2014, he became host of talk show "Bizim kimi".

References

Living people
Azerbaijani record producers
Azerbaijani television producers
Date of birth missing (living people)
1978 births